Mark Flanagan (born in Liverpool) is a blues guitarist who plays with Jools Holland's band, The Rhythm and Blues Orchestra. He also fronts the trio "Flanagan", which currently includes himself, Adam Double and George Double. He is also fronting the band The Fields.

He is also a frequent session musician for live television appearances, having worked with Chaka Khan, Paul Weller, Barry White, Eric Clapton and George Harrison.

Early life
He attended St Edwards College, Liverpool.

Recordings
As Flanagan he released Like a Fool in 2000 the UK under the United Notions Productions label, with Alajih Malik and Gary Foote. In 2002, as Flanagan again, he released The Chosen Few in the UK, under Swashbuckle Records. On The Chosen Few Flanagan consisted of himself, Willoughby and Foote. With The Fields, he released Down the Wire in August 2005, The Fields being himself, Jimmy Bergin and Barnes Goulding.

References

External links
 Movinmusic Blues Agency biography
 Review of Jools Holland show in Norfolk on 23 July 2005, with The Fields headlining
 Review of Jools Holland show at the Edinburgh Jazz and Blues Festival 2005, with The Fields headlining

Year of birth missing (living people)
Living people
English blues guitarists
English male guitarists
Musicians from Liverpool
Jools Holland's Rhythm and Blues Orchestra members